Lindokuhle John Mbatha (born 25 June 1985) is a South African international footballer who plays for TS Galaxy, as a right winger.

Career
Mbatha has played club football for SA City Pillars, Mpumalanga Black Aces, Platinum Stars, Mamelodi Sundowns and TS Galaxy.

He made his international debut for South Africa in 2014.

References

1985 births
Living people
South African soccer players
South Africa international soccer players
Mpumalanga Black Aces F.C. players
Platinum Stars F.C. players
Mamelodi Sundowns F.C. players
TS Galaxy F.C. players
Association football wingers
South Africa A' international soccer players
2014 African Nations Championship players